Maydanskoye is a rural locality (a selo) and the administrative center of Maydansky Selsoviet, Untsukulsky District, Republic of Dagestan, Russia. The population was 2,641 as of 2010. There are 41 streets.

Geography 
Maydanskoye is located 18 km southeast of Shamilkala (the district's administrative centre) by road. Zirani is the nearest rural locality.

References 

Rural localities in Untsukulsky District